John Hope may refer to:

United Kingdom
John Hope (died c.1599), MP for Flintshire (UK Parliament constituency)
John Hope, Lord Craighall (1605?–1654), Scottish judge
Sir John Bruce Hope (c.1684–1766), MP for Kinross, 1727–1734, 1741–1747
John Hope, 2nd Earl of Hopetoun (1704–1781)
John Hope (botanist) (1725–1786), Scottish surgeon and botanist
John Hope (writer) (1739–1785), British politician and writer
John Hope, 4th Earl of Hopetoun (1765–1823), Scottish soldier and politician
Sir John Hope (British Army officer, born 1765) (1765–1836), British Army general
Sir John Hope, 11th Baronet (1781–1853), MP for Midlothian, 1845–1853
John Hope, Lord Hope (1794–1858), Scottish judge
 John Hope (lawyer) (1807-1893), Scottish lawyer and philanthropist
John Hope (Liberal politician) (1860–1949), Scottish Liberal politician
Sir John Hope, 16th Baronet (1869–1924), MP for Midlothian, 1912–1918, and Midlothian North and Peebles, 1918–1922
John Hope, 1st Baron Glendevon (1912–1996), Scottish Tory politician
John Hope (footballer) (1949–2016), English football goalkeeper
John Hope (merchant), French courtier and merchant who settled in Edinburgh

United States
John C. Hope (1806–1879), Lutheran scholar, priest and politician from South Carolina
John Hope (educator) (1868–1936), American educator, first African-American president of Morehouse College and Atlanta University
John Hope (meteorologist) (1919–2002), American meteorologist and hurricane forecaster
John Hope (baseball) (1970–2018), American baseball pitcher

Other
Jan Hope (1737–1784), also called John Hope, Dutch banker (Hope & Co.) and owner of Groenendaal park
John Hope (Australian politician) (1842–1926), Scottish-born Tasmanian politician
John Hope, 7th Earl of Hopetoun (1860–1908), first Governor-General of Australia
John Hope (cricketer, born 1841) (1841–1910), New Zealand cricketer
John Hope (cricketer, born 1866) (1866–1950), New Zealand cricketer
John Hope (priest), Anglican priest in Sydney, Australia